Women's Artistic Gymnasts are women who participate in the sport of gymnastics, specifically artistic gymnastics.  Women first competed in Gymnastics at the Summer Olympics in 1928.  This list is of those who are considered to be notable in women's artistic gymnastics.  See gymnasium (ancient Greece) for the origin of the word gymnast from gymnastikos.



A

B

C

D

E

F

G

H

I

J

L

M

N

P

R

S

U

See also
List of gymnasts
International Gymnastics Hall of Fame
List of Olympic medalists in gymnastics (women)
List of current female artistic gymnasts

Notes

References 

Gymnastics-related lists
Women's Artistic